The Black Knights were a Merseybeat three-piece band formed in Liverpool in the early 1960s. Their lead singer and rhythm guitarist was Ken Griffiths (born 1942), the bassist and backing vocalist was Bill Kenny (born 1942), and the drummer was initially Taffy Jones, who left to join The Tempos and later Allan Schroeder (born 19 April 1942), formerly of Cliff Roberts & the Rockers.

The band successfully auditioned for the Gerry & the Pacemakers film Ferry Cross the Mersey, and their amplifiers were sponsored by Selmer UK. Their debut single "I Gotta Woman" / "Angel of Love", written by Griffiths and produced by George Martin at Abbey Road Studios, was released in 1965. They followed with a tour of the United Kingdom (with The Animals and The Moody Blues) and a six-week residency at the Star-Club in Hamburg, but split up shortly after returning to the UK. Schroeder later reformed the band under the same name, performing live in the 1990s and 2000s.

References

External links
Selmer Amplifier Black Knight Pictures - from the Famous Selmer Users Gallery. Accessed 7 September 2005.
 The Black Knights - from The British Beat Boom. Accessed 7 September 2005.
The Black Knights - Mersey Beat. Accessed 7 September 2005.

English pop music groups
Musical groups from Liverpool
Beat groups
British musical trios